Cork, Bandon and South Coast Railway (CB&SCR), was an Irish gauge railway in Ireland. It opened in 1849 as the Cork and Bandon Railway (C&BR), changed its name to Cork Bandon and South Coast Railway in 1888 and became part of the Great Southern Railway (GSR) in 1924.

The CB&SCR served the south coast of County Cork between Cork and Bantry. Many road car routes connected with the line, including the route from Bantry to Killarney.

Following absorption into the GSR and the network could be referred to as the West Cork Railways or variations thereof, this also encompassing the former previously independent Cork and Macroom Direct Railway and the Timoleague and Courtmacsherry Railway.

History

The  section from Ballinhassig to Cork opened to public services on 1 December 1851. The C&BR was financially challenged after by building the Bandon to Cork section which had had some cost overruns and future extensions to the network were undertaken by independent companies some of which operated their own services for a number years.

Extensions to the railway
The C&BR completed purchase of the line from the C&KJR on 1 January 1880. 

The West Cork Railway (WCR) was formed with the intention of extending the line to Skibbereen, the C&BR being in favour of such an extension but without the ability to raise the capital itself. The WCR opened the  section from Bandon to ) in June 1866 and operated the section itself hiring in rolling stock and locomotives from elsewhere. The WCR itself was unable to resource the building of the  Dunmanway to Skibbereen section which was completed by the Ilen Valley Railway (IVR) opening in 1877. Following arbitration the section was worked by the WCR. The operating situation agreed to was resolved on 1 January 1880 by running the network under a single operational management, the C&BR leasing the IVR until absorbing it in 1909 whilst concluding terms to absorb the WCR in October 1882.

In 1886 Skibbereen became an interchange with the  narrow gauge Schull and Skibbereen Railway.

The Clonakilty Extension Railway (from Clonakilty Junction), opened on 24 August 1886 and was operated by the C&BR. The siding was created in 1887 and extended to the mill shortly thereafter and remained horse operated until closure in 1961. Horse traction was used uphill, and trains were worked by gravity downhill.

On 21 September 1887 a draft Bill was submitted to the company's board. The draft would give the C&BR powers to construct a  line to avoid Gogginshill Tunnel, at an estimated cost of £10,702. Other powers to be granted included a connecting line to the Cork, Blackrock and Passage Railway, extensions to Cork's quays, and closure of the Gas Works level crossing. Cork Corporation objected to the quay line and level crossing closure, and the connection to the Cork, Blackrock and Passage was defeated. The Cork Bandon and South Coast Railway Act, 1888 passed on 5 July, changing the name of the C&BR to the Cork Bandon and South Coast Railway (CB&SCR). Powers to build the line avoiding Gogginshill Tunnel were granted in this Act, but the line was never built.

Direct passenger services onto the pier were introduced in 1908 to connect with Bantry Bay steamers. These services ceased in 1936 and the pier was dismantled in 1949.

The CB&SCR was subject to various damaging incidents during the 1922—1923 Irish Civil War, the most damaging to the railway being the partial destruction of the Chetwynd Viaduct on 9 August 1922. Passenger services were restored between Cork and Bandon on 20 February 1923, with full service across the network being restored on 23 May.

GSR and CIÉ years
The CB&SCR, Great Southern and Western Railway, and Midland Great Western Railway were amalgamated into the Great Southern Railway in 1924. It then amalgamated with the Dublin and South Eastern Railway to form the Great Southern Railways in 1925, absorbing the smaller railways within the Irish Free State.

Due to mounting losses the Kinsale branch was closed on 31 August 1931. A parliamentary question asked in February 1934 sought to prevent the line from being lifted, but the relevant minister lacked the power to do so. The line was fully lifted that summer. The junction station remained open, being renamed Crossbarry in October 1936.

The GSR was consolidated into Córas Iompair Éireann in 1945.

CIÉ introduced AEC railcars to the railway in 1954.

Closure
Due to economic problems, competition from road traffic and falling passenger numbers, the line closed on 1 April 1961. The planned closure of the railway network met with strong local opposition, including the establishment of the West Cork Railways Association. At a meeting of Cork County Council's Southern Committee on 3 October 1960, councillors were very critical of CIÉ's running of the line.

A report published by a local pressure group in 2022 suggested that the railway in West Cork could feasibly return. This suggestion was rejected by Minister for Transport Eamon Ryan.

Route
The system was completely built as single track with passing facilities provided at most stations.  As a condition of loans from the Board of Works some infrastructure on the main line was built to accommodate later conversion to double track, this had implications for costs particularly at Gogginshill Tunnel.

Rocksavage works
The Rocksavage works and yard serviced the CB&SCR rolling stock and was situated at the south end of the site encompassing the  terminus complex.  The works built a single locomotive, the  CB&SCR No. 7/GSR No. 478 in 1901 that was composed mostly of parts salvaged from other locomotives.  On amalgamation to the GSR in 1925 major repair work was transferred to Inchicore with Rocksavage being used for light repairs.

Major infrastructure

Chetwynd Viaduct

It was designed by Charles Nixon (a former pupil of I.K. Brunel), and built between 1849 and 1851 by Fox, Henderson and Co, which also built the Crystal Palace in London.

The  cast iron ribs were cast on site. When in situ they had transverse diagonal bracing and lattice spandrels that supported a deck of iron plates. These in turn supported the permanent way.

The structure was seriously damaged in the Irish Civil War in 1922, but was subsequently repaired. It was in regular use until the line was closed in 1961, though "recovery" trains continued to use it during the dismantling of the line until at least 1965.  The bulk of the decking was in place as late as 1970, other than at the ends, but this was all subsequently removed for safety reasons.

Gogginshill Tunnel

The Gogginshill Tunnel near Ballinhassig in Co. Cork, was constructed between February 1850 and December 1851 by 300 men working day and night.  There are three ventilation shafts and the tunnel is lined with brick, which was added between 1889 and 1890 after some minor collapses of the rock face.

It is the longest abandoned railway tunnel within the Republic of Ireland, measuring 906 yards (828 metres) end to end.

Halfway Viaduct

The Viaduct is located at Halfway, between Innishannon and Ballinhassig, c.30m above the valley floor.  It is a three arch viaduct of masonry construction.

Kilpatrick Tunnel

The Kilpatrick (Innishannon) tunnel is 122 meters in length and located less than 1 km west of Inishannon, just before the River Bandon crossing.

Services

Passenger services on the C&BR and CB&SCR were of low frequency with most routes seeing up to a handful of trains each way a most, with connections being of poor quality at times.

Regular diesel railcar operations began on the Cork to  service from 28 May 1954 and permitted a reduction in journey time of 38 minutes.

1948 Timetable
On the right is the Cork to Bantry passenger timetable that was operational from 1948 until the closure in 1961. A few points may be noted from it:
 Travel time was about 2 hours. In 2008, a car journey (without the nine intermittent stops) is less than 30 minutes faster, according to the AA website.
 It was not possible to make a same-day return journey from Bandon to Dublin as the Cork express train left at 9:00 am (arriving at 12:00 pm) and departed at 2:25 pm from Heuston (which would have allowed the 6:00 pm connection to Bandon to be made though).

Rolling stock
Following the 1924 grouping the Great Southern Railway inherited 20 locomotives CB&SCR.  At some point the CB&SCR was recorded as having 68 coaching vehicles and 455 goods vehicles.

Locomotives
Over 40 steam locomotives were used by the C&BR/CB&SCR, mostly of the tank variety though some early examples had tenders.  The most notable are generally considered to be the  bandon tanks build by Beyer, Peacock and Company between 1908 and 1920.  Also of note are two Baldwin locomotives, the  design of 1900 being the only instance of steam locomotives supplied from America to Ireland.

Livery
The locomotives and carriages were various shades of olive green often with yellow lining.

See also
 History of rail transport in Ireland
 History of Durrus and District

References

Notes

Footnotes

Sources and further reading
 
 
 
 
 
 
 
 
 
Hume, Robert,"The mystery crash of the West Cork train that never reached Dunmanway", Southern Star 13 May 2017, p.9
 
 
O'Donovan, Daniel, On removal of Bantry line Durrus, Bantry, (oral history)

External links

 Beneathesummergrowth.wordpress.com

Defunct railway companies of Ireland
Transport in County Cork
Transport in County Kerry
Irish gauge railways
Railway companies disestablished in 1961